Guentzel is a surname. Notable people with the surname include:

Jake Guentzel (born 1994), American ice hockey player
Mike Guentzel (born 1962), American ice hockey player and coach
Gabe Guentzel (born 1988), American ice hockey player

See also
Gentzel